Suva Football Club is a Fijian football club that competes in the Fiji Premier League, the top flight of professional Fijian football. The club is based in Suva. Their home stadium is ANZ National Stadium.

History

Early years 
Football started to be played in Fiji with the arrival of Europeans. The Suva Football Club was formed in 1905, made up of European employees of the Government and businesses. In 1910, a team from Suva played a match against a team from Nausori.  Crew of visiting naval ships also entertained themselves with friendly games of football with local teams. In 1910 a team from Suva played a game against a team from HMS Powerful and won 3 goals to 1. In 1914, a team from Suva played against a team from HMS Torch, at Albert Park, and won by 2 goals to 0. In 1930, the Governor made available two playing fields in Suva for use in football competitions. In 1922, the Sunshine Club was established in Suva. There were also four teams in Suva who played at the Marist Brothers School grounds in Toorak. In December 1927, the league organised a schools football competition at Albert Park. Schools that took part in it were Methodist Mission School, Marist Brothers School and Islamia School. Buoyed by the success of this tournament, the league met on 22 January 1928 and formed a Football Association committee. In 1936, the association was renamed, the Suva Football Association. The number of teams grew to 8 in 1936, 16 in 1945 and 41 in 1958 with competition being organised in senior, reserve, intermediate and junior grades.

Fiji National League era 
In 1977, Suva Football Club participated in the Fijian football top-tier league, the 1977 Fiji National League, which was inaugural season of the Fiji National League.

Current squad
Squad for the 2022 Fiji Premier League

Staff

Former players

  Abdul Aman

Achievements 
League Championship (for Districts): 4
 1996, 1997, 2014, 2020.

 Inter-District Championship : 13
 1940, 1945, 1946, 1948, 1951, 1952, 1954, 1956, 1960, 1981, 1983, 2012, 2014.
Runner Up: 2018, 2019.

Battle of the Giants: 3
 1982, 1988, 1995.

Fiji Football Association Cup Tournament: 4
 1995, 2012, 2020, 2022.

Champion versus Champion Series: 0

See also 
 Fiji Football Association

Bibliography 
 M. Prasad, Sixty Years of Soccer in Fiji 1938–1998: The Official History of the Fiji Football Association, Fiji Football Association, Suva, 1998.

References

Football clubs in Fiji
Sport in Suva
1928 establishments in Fiji
Association football clubs established in 1928